Anni Stolte (24 February 1915 – 18 April 1994) was a German swimmer. She competed in the women's 100 metre backstroke at the 1936 Summer Olympics.

References

External links
 

1915 births
1994 deaths
German female swimmers
Olympic swimmers of Germany
Swimmers at the 1936 Summer Olympics
Sportspeople from Düsseldorf